North Field can refer to:

North Field (Tinian) on Tinian from which the aircraft were launched to drop the atomic bombs on Japan during World War II
North Field (Iwo Jima) or Iwo Jima Air Base, a World War II airfield on Iwo Jima in the Bonin Islands and still in operation today
South Pars / North Dome Gas-Condensate field, a gas reserve beneath the Persian Gulf
The name of Andersen Air Force Base, Guam during the Second World War